Laura Kivistö (born 26 June 1981) is a Finnish football defender. She plays for PK-35 Vantaa in the Naisten Liiga.

Club career
She played for HJK Helsinki before joining PK-35 Vantaa in 2013.

International career
She was called up to be part of the national team for UEFA Women's Euro 2013.

Honours

Club
HJK Helsinki
Winner
 Finnish Women's Cup: 2010
 Liiga Cup Naiset: 2010, 2011, 2012

References

External links
 
 Profile at fussballtransfers.com
 
 Profile at soccerdonna.de

1981 births
Living people
Finnish women's footballers
Finland women's international footballers
Kansallinen Liiga players
Helsingin Jalkapalloklubi (women) players
PK-35 Vantaa (women) players
FC United (Jakobstad) players
People from Raahe
Women's association football defenders
Sportspeople from North Ostrobothnia